The Lycée Pierre-de-Fermat, also referred to simply as Pierre-de-Fermat, is a public Lycée, located in the Parvis des Jacobins in Toulouse, in the immediate vicinity of the Place du Capitole; It occupies a large space in the city center including the Hôtel de Bernuy. It adjoins the cloister and the church of the Jacobins.

At the start of the 2021 school year, the high school has 9 second, first and final year classes of an average of 30 students for a total of just over 1,800 students, including 950 students in Classe préparatoire aux grandes écoles (CPGE).
It hosts one of the best preparatory classes to the grandes écoles program of the country - a post-secondary intensive multidisciplinary program : it ranked 8th nationwide for the literary stream  and 3rd nationwide for the physics and engineering stream  in 2022.

Notable alumni 

 Suzanne Aigrain, a professor of Astrophysics
 Jean Dussourd, a French civil servant
 Marie-Sophie Lacarrau, a French journalist and TV presenter
 Robert Miguet, a French civil servant
 Louis Pailhas, a French public servant
 Khalilou Sall, a Senegalese politician and engineer
 Victor Ségoffin, a French sculptor
 Carlos Tavares, a Portuguese businessman
 Jean-Michel Vernhes, a French public servant
 Georges Pompidou, a former French president

References

External links

 Lycée Pierre-de-Fermat (official website)

1806 establishments in France
Education in Toulouse
Educational institutions established in 1806